DRG Class 97 is a class of German rack railway steam locomotive operated by the Deutsche Reichsbahn comprising:
 Class 97.0: Prussian T 26
 Class 97.1: Bavarian PtzL 3/4
 Class 97.2: Baden IX b
 Class 97.2II: kkStB 69
 Class 97.3: Württemberg Fz
 Class 97.3II: kkStB 269
 Class 97.4: Prussian T 28
 Class 97.4II: BBÖ 369, later ÖBB 297
 Class 97.5: Württemberg Hz
 Class 97.6: kkStB 169

References

97
97
Rack and cog driven locomotives